Hojat Chaharmahali (born March 25, 1989 in Shoushtar, Iran) is an Iranian football player who plays for the Iran Pro League club Esteghlal Khuzestan.

Club career
Chaharmahali started his career at Foolad FC in 2005. Chaharmahali played for Foolad in the 2006 AFC Champions League group stage.

On November 14, 2006 Radio Farda reported that Olympiacos were to sign Chaharmahali on a 5-year deal, although the deal did not go through.

Club career statistics

International career
He plays for Iran national under-20 football team and Iran national under-23 football team.

Honours
Esteghlal
Iran Pro League (1): 2012–13

References

External links
 Profile on Foolad Khuzestan Official Website

Iranian footballers
Association football forwards
1989 births
Living people
Foolad FC players
People from Shushtar
Sanat Naft Abadan F.C. players
Esteghlal F.C. players
Esteghlal Khuzestan players
Sportspeople from Khuzestan province